James Alexander Robertson Menzies (21 February 1821 – 18 August 1888) was the first superintendent of the Southland Province in New Zealand from 3 August 1861 to November 1864, during its breakaway from Otago Province (1861 to 1870). He continued serving on the Provincial Council after his superintendency ended.

During Menzies' tenure as superintendent, two railways projects were undertaken, a railway to link Invercargill to the port at Bluff and a wooden railway to Winton. The former is now known as the Bluff Branch, while the latter was upgraded to the standards of a normal railway and extended to ultimately form the Kingston Branch.

Menzies served on the Legislative Council for 30 years, from 1858 until his death in 1888, and promoted the interests of Southland.

See also 
 Southland, New Zealand

References

1821 births
1888 deaths
Superintendents of New Zealand provincial councils
People from Southland, New Zealand
Members of the Southland Provincial Council
Members of the New Zealand Legislative Council
New Zealand farmers
Scottish surgeons
Members of the Otago Provincial Council
Scottish emigrants to New Zealand
19th-century New Zealand politicians